Allerona is a comune (municipality) in the Province of Terni in the Italian region Umbria, located about 50 km southwest of Perugia and about 60 km northwest of Terni.

Wartime tragedy
On 28 January 1944, during World War II, the Orvieto North railway bridge at Allerona was the site of the inadvertent bombing by the American 320th Bombardment Group of a train filled with Allied prisoners. Most of the POWs had come from Camp P.G. 54, Fara in Sabina, 35 kilometres to the north of Rome, and had been evacuated in anticipation of the Allied advance. One of the men on the train, Richard Morris of the U.S. Army, had been captured at Venafro, imprisoned at Frosinone, sent to P.G. 54 and had been put on the train, which was presumably heading to Germany. In his memoirs, Morris wrote that the train was halted on the bridge over the river when the Allied bombs started to fall, and that the  German guards fled the train, leaving the prisoners locked inside. Many, including Morris, escaped through holes in the boxcars caused by the bombing, and jumped into the river below.  Anglo-American historian Iris Origo wrote in her diary, War in Val d'Orcia, that "some of the carriages plunged into the river: there were over four hundred dead and wounded."

References

External links
Official website
Thayer's Gazetteer of Umbria

Cities and towns in Umbria